Syria participated at the 2018 Asian Para Games which was held in Jakarta, Indonesia from 6 to 13 October 2018. The team consists of 9 athletes who competed in 2 sports: 5 in athletics and 4 in powerlifting.

Medalist

Medals by Sport

Medalist

See also
 Syria at the 2018 Asian Games

References

Nations at the 2018 Asian Para Games
2018 in Syrian sport